San Antonio District or San Antonio de Esquilache District is one of fifteen districts of the Puno Province in the Puno Region of Peru.

Geography 
Some of the highest mountains of the district are listed below:

Ethnic groups 
The people in the district are mainly indigenous citizens of Quechua descent. Quechua is the language which the majority of the population (85.94%) learnt to speak in childhood, 8.60% of the residents started speaking using the Aymara language and 5.46% learnt Spanish as the first language (2007 Peru Census).

References